Whitefield is a town in the Metropolitan Borough of Bury, Greater Manchester, England and contains the area of Stand.  It is unparished, and contains 14 listed buildings that are recorded in the National Heritage List for England.  Of these, one is listed at Grade I, the highest of the three grades, and the others are at Grade II, the lowest grade.  The area is mainly residential, and the listed buildings include houses and associated structures, churches and related items, and two war memorials.


Key

Buildings

References

Citations

Sources

Lists of listed buildings in Greater Manchester
Buildings and structures in the Metropolitan Borough of Bury
Listed